is a city in Hyōgo Prefecture, Japan. The city calls itself "The Navel of Japan (Nihon no Heso)." Located at the crossing of the 135° East meridian and the 35° North parallel, the city's Nihon no Heso Park marks the center of the nation

Geography
Nishiwaki is located in the northern Harima region of Hyōgo prefecture, about 50 kilometers north of Kobe city, bordered by the Chugoku Mountains to the north. The Kakogawa River, Sugihara River, and the Noma River flow through the city,

Neighbouring municipalities 
Hyōgo Prefecture
 Kasai
 Katō
 Taka
 Sasayama
 Tanba

Climate
Nishiwaki has a humid subtropical climate (Köppen climate classification Cfa) with hot summers and cool to cold winters. Precipitation is significantly higher in summer than in winter, though on the whole lower than most parts of Honshū, and there is no significant snowfall.

Demographics
Per Japanese census data, the population of Nishiwaki in 2020 is 38,673 people. Nishiwaki has been conducting censuses since 1920.

History 
The area of Nishiwaki was in ancient Harima Province. In the Edo Period, most of the area was tenryō territory under direct administration of the Tokugawa shogunate. Following the Meiji restoration, the village of Sugata, was created within Taka District, Hyōgo with the creation of the modern municipalities system April 1, 1889.  It was raised to town status on November 1, 1917, changing its name to Nishiwaki. On April 1,1952 Nishiwaki merged with the neighboring villages of Hino, Shigeharu, and Hiesho to form the city of Nishiwaki. On October 1, 2005, the town of Kurodashō (from Taka District) was merged into Nishiwaki.

Government
Nishiwaki has a mayor-council form of government with a directly elected mayor and a unicameral city council of 16 members. Nishiwaki, together with the town of Taki, contributes one member to the Hyogo Prefectural Assembly. In terms of national politics, the city is part of Hyōgo 4th district of the lower house of the Diet of Japan.

Economy
From the middle of the Edo period (1792), the area has been noted for the production of a striped cloth per a technique introduced from Nishijin in Kyoto, called "Banshu weaving". In the latter half of the Meiji era became known nationwide, and still has a share of more than 70% of domestic yarn-dyed textiles. Other noted products include the production of Kobe beef.

Education
Nishiwaki has eight public elementary schools and four public middle schools operated by the city government and three public high schools operated by the Hyōgo Prefectural Department of Education.

Transportation

Railway 
 JR West - Kakogawa Line
 ] -  -  -  -  -  -

Highways

International relations

Sister cities

  Renton, Washington, U.S.A since 1969. Since then there have been mutual exchanges between the cities, most notably the annual middle school exchange program which began in 1989. (The US delegation was in Japan October 3–13, 1989.) The initial delegation from the US included (future) actress Casey Strand.

Culture

Mascots 
Nisshi (にっしー） was made to promote the city in 2010, and she wears a blue clothes made of "Banshu-Ori", which is a kind of textile and famous in Nisiwaki city.

Sakura (さくら) is Nisshi's sister and wears pink clothes.

Heso-no-Kanchan (へそのかんちゃん) was made to promote a historical drama, Gunshi-Kanbe (軍師官兵衛), which had been broadcast in 2014.
"Kanchan" was designed after the model of Kanbe's appearance in his childhood.

Noted people from Nishiwaki
Tadanori Yokoo, graphic designer
Yoshinori Tokura, physicist
Iwaichi Fujiwara, army general
Ogura Seiji,drummer flumpool

References

External links

 Nishiwaki City official website 

Cities in Hyōgo Prefecture
Nishiwaki, Hyōgo